Kim van Sparrentak (born Middelburg, 16 October 1989) is a Dutch politician who is serving as a Member of the European Parliament for the GroenLinks political party.

References

External links

Living people
GroenLinks MEPs
MEPs for the Netherlands 2019–2024
21st-century women MEPs for the Netherlands
1989 births